The Best Coin Fold is the title of a magic trick (effect) which appeared in Jean Hugard's book, Close Up Magic, published in 1938. A coin fold is an effect that involves the appearance of a magician folding a coin up within a piece of paper seemingly trapping the coin therein. The magician then causes the coin to vanish and (often) reappear elsewhere. Magic literature (within the 20th century) contains numerous references to coin fold techniques and presentations. The "trick" is built around special procedures or techniques in folding the paper such that it appears that the coin is trapped, but in fact it easily slides out undetected by the spectator.

References

Magic tricks